The Schauder fixed-point theorem is an extension of the Brouwer fixed-point theorem to topological vector spaces, which may be of infinite dimension.

A consequence, called Schaefer's fixed-point theorem, is particularly useful for proving existence of solutions to nonlinear partial differential equations.
Schaefer's theorem is in fact a special case of the far reaching Leray–Schauder theorem which was proved earlier by  Juliusz Schauder and Jean Leray.
The statement is as follows:

Let  be a continuous and compact mapping of a Banach space  into itself, such that the set

 

is bounded.  Then  has a fixed point. (A compact mapping in this context is one for which the image of every bounded set is relatively compact.)

History
The theorem was conjectured and proven for special cases, such as Banach spaces, by Juliusz Schauder in 1930. His conjecture for the general case was published in the Scottish book. In 1934, Tychonoff proved the theorem for the case when K is a compact convex subset of a locally convex space. This version is known as the Schauder–Tychonoff fixed-point theorem. B. V. Singbal proved the theorem for the more general case where K may be non-compact; the proof can be found in the appendix of Bonsall's book (see references).

See also
  Fixed-point theorems
  Banach fixed-point theorem
  Kakutani fixed-point theorem

References
 J. Schauder, Der Fixpunktsatz in Funktionalräumen, Studia Math. 2 (1930), 171–180
 A. Tychonoff, Ein Fixpunktsatz, Mathematische Annalen 111 (1935), 767–776
 F. F. Bonsall, Lectures on some fixed point theorems of functional analysis, Bombay 1962
 D. Gilbarg, N. Trudinger, Elliptic Partial Differential Equations of Second Order. .
 E. Zeidler, Nonlinear Functional Analysis and its Applications, I - Fixed-Point Theorems

External links

 
   
 .

Fixed-point theorems
Theorems in functional analysis
Topological vector spaces